Moogega Cooper (born 1985) is an American astronomer, and the Lead of Planetary Protection for the Mars 2020 Mission and is involved with the InSight Mission. Dr. Cooper also takes part in programs and speaking engagements to encourage young women or and others from underrepresented communities to pursue careers in science and technology.

Early life
Cooper was born in 1985 in Southern New Jersey to a Korean mother and African-American father, and World War II veteran. She received a B.A. in Physics from Hampton University in 2006, followed by a Masters and Ph.D. in Mechanical Engineering with a concentration in thermal fluid sciences from Drexel University College of Engineering. Cooper's dissertation focused on non-equilibrium plasma sterilization of spacecraft materials, enabling her to obtain a position with the Jet Propulsion Laboratory's (JPL) Planetary Protection Group in 2011. Cooper is the Lead of Planetary Protection for the Mars 2020 Mission and is a member of the planetary protection team for the InSight Mission. Planetary protection is the practice of protecting solar system bodies from contamination by Earth life and protecting Earth from possible life forms that may be returned from other solar system bodies.

TV appearances
Cooper was a participant on the first season of King of the Nerds, which aired on TBS in 2013, finishing in 5th place. Cooper was a panelist in "The Original Martian Invasion", a 2017 episode of the television series Bill Nye Saves the World. She also appeared in 33 episodes of How the Universe Works from 2015 to 2020.

Selected publications 

 Cooper, M. (2004). Validation of SABER temperature measurements using ground-based instruments. IGARSS 2004. 2004 IEEE International Geoscience and Remote Sensing Symposium, 6, 4099–4101 vol.6. https://doi.org/10.1109/IGARSS.2004.1370033
 Nagaraj, Balasubramanian, M., Kalghatgi, S., Wu, A. S., Brooks, A. D., Fridman, G., Cooper, M., Vasilets, V. N., Gutsol, A., Fridman, A., & Friedman, G. (2007). Mechanism of Blood Coagulation by Non-Thermal Atmospheric Pressure Dielectric Barrier Discharge Plasma. Blood, 110(11), 3162–3162. https://doi.org/10.1182/blood.V110.11.3162.3162
 Cooper, M., Fridman, G., Staack, D., Gutsol, A. ., Vasilets, V. ., Anandan, S., Cho, Y. ., Fridman, A., & Tsapin, A. (2009). Decontamination of Surfaces From Extremophile Organisms Using Nonthermal Atmospheric-Pressure Plasmas. IEEE Transactions on Plasma Science, 37(6), 866–871. https://doi.org/10.1109/TPS.2008.2010618
 Cooper, M. La Duc, M. T., Probst, A., Vaishampayan, P., Stam, C., Benardini, J. N., Piceno, Y. M., Andersen, G. L., & Venkateswaran, K. (2011). Comparison of Innovative Molecular Approaches and Standard Spore Assays for Assessment of Surface Cleanliness. Applied and Environmental Microbiology, 77(15), 5438–5444. https://doi.org/10.1128/AEM.00192-11
 Robinson, Rakhmanov, R., Cooper-Stricker, M., & Dobrynin, D. (2019). Subatmospheric Pressure Microsecond Spark Discharge Plasma Jet for Surface Decontamination. IEEE Transactions on Plasma Science, 47(10), 4677–4682. https://doi.org/10.1109/TPS.2019.2936996

Awards

 NASA Early Career Public Achievement Medal (2018)
 Charles Elachi Award for Exceptional Early Career Achievement (2018)
 Drexel University 40 under 40 Award (2015)
 NASA Group Achievement Award, “For exceptional performance in the rigorous evaluation and rapid synthesis of a development strategy for the Mars Sample Return Planetary Protection technology.” October 2012.

References

1985 births
20th-century African-American scientists
20th-century African-American women
20th-century American astronomers
20th-century American engineers
20th-century American women scientists
21st-century African-American scientists
21st-century African-American women
21st-century American astronomers
21st-century American engineers
21st-century American women scientists
African-American engineers
American people of Korean descent
Hampton University alumni
Jet Propulsion Laboratory
Living people
NASA people
Planetary scientists
Women planetary scientists